Mina per Wind is an EP by Italian singer Mina.

Content

The album contains four songs, all with the word "wind" in the title. The album was recorded in 2000 as part of a special offer of Italian-based "Wind Telecommunications" which consisted of a package including a phone card and this album.

"The Wind Cries Mary" is a cover of the rock ballad by the Jimi Hendrix Experience and written by Jimi Hendrix.
"Blowin' in the Wind" is a cover of the song written by Bob Dylan in 1962 and released on his album The Freewheelin' Bob Dylan in 1963.
"Ride Like the Wind" is a cover of a song by American singer-songwriter Christopher Cross.
"Gone with the Wind" is a cover of a popular song written by Allie Wrubel and Herb Magidson in 1937 and sung by Horace Heidt.

Track listing

Musicians
Mina Mazzini – Vocals and background vocals
Massimiliano Pani – Keyboards
Nicolò Fragile – Keyboards and Piano
Gianni Ferrio – Strings
Giorgio Cocilovo  – Acoustic Guitar, Electric Guitar
Massimo Moriconi  – Bass, Contrabass
Alfredo Golino – Drums
Andrea Braido – Electric Guitar
Gabriele Comeglio  – Saxophone, Wind instruments
Mauro Parodi  – Trombone
Emilio Soana – Trumpet

References

2000 EPs
Mina (Italian singer) EPs